Gornja Bučica  is a village in Croatia.

Religion

Roman Catholic Church of the Saint Anthony of Padua
Roman Catholic Church of the Saint Anthony of Padua in Gornja Bučica was constructed in 1836. In 1991, during the Croatian War of Independence the church was shelled by the forces of the self-proclaimed Republic of Serbian Krajina. The object restoration was completed after the end of war.

References

External links

Populated places in Sisak-Moslavina County
Glina, Croatia